Penion proavitus is an extinct species of marine snail or whelk, belonging to the true whelk family Buccinidae.

Description
Penion proavitus fossils are the earliest known specimens of Penion siphon whelks. The species was medium-to-large in size.

It is possible that fossils of Penion proavitus represent a stem lineage that was the common ancestor of Penion, Kelletia and Antarctoneptunea, instead of a species of Penion itself.

Distribution
Fossils of Penion proavitus are found in New Zealand's South Island. The species lived in the seas surrounding Zealandia between 56 and 66 million million years ago (Teurian stage).

References

External links

 Auckland War Memorial Museum Penion proavitus

Buccinidae
Gastropods of New Zealand
Extinct animals of New Zealand
Taxa named by Harold John Finlay